Nihat Haluk Bilginer (born 5 June 1954) is a Turkish actor. In addition to his acting career in Turkey, he has also worked in the United Kingdom and remains best known for his role as Mehmet Osman in the television soap opera EastEnders during the 1980s. He has also starred in Hollywood movies as a minor actor. He played a villainous guerrilla leader in the 1987 comedy film Ishtar and a Turkish Mafioso in the 2001 dark comedy film Buffalo Soldiers.

For his role in Şahsiyet (2018), Bilginer won the Best Actor award at the 47th International Emmy Awards.

Life and career 
Bilginer was born in İzmir, Turkey. He graduated from the Ankara State Conservatory in 1977 before going to England where he graduated from the London Academy of Music and Dramatic Art. He landed his first role in the long running UK soap opera EastEnders.

EastEnders (1985–1989)
Bilginer made his first appearance in EastEnders as Mehmet Osman on-screen in June 1985, four months after the show originally aired. His arrival coincides with a cot death storyline of Sue and Ali's baby, Hassan. Mehmet appears as a recurring character from 1985 to 1987, setting up a cab firm named Ozcabs from inside Ali's café; however, he becomes a regular in 1988, when both he and his wife Guizin (Ishia Bennison) are made partners in Ali's café, which is renamed Café Osman.

Described as "the Terrible Turk", Haluk Bilginer was one of the more popular male cast members on EastEnders during the 1980s, and he reportedly received sackfuls of fan mail, "despite playing a villain and a womanising snake". Hilary Kingsley has said that what made the character so popular was Bilginer's Omar Sharif-style good looks and charm. Following the departure of Holland and Smith, Mehmet was eventually written out of the serial in May 1989, in a storyline that signified the disbandment of the Osman family. On-screen, Mehmet returns to his native Cyprus after a fight with Guizin regarding her suspicions about Mehmet's fabricated affair with Sue. The Osman family were among many characters to leave the serial that year. Writer Colin Brake has commented, "the pace of comings and going was fast and furious during 1989, as the programme tried to find a new direction." Bilginer went into musical theatre after leaving EastEnders starring in Ken Hill's popular musical adaptation of the Guy de Maupassant novel The Wicked World of Bel-Ami at the Theatre Royal Stratford East, working with Fiona Hendley, Toni Palmer, Peter Straker and Colin Atkins.

After EastEnders

During the course of the show, he came to Turkey to star in the 1987 TV series Gecenin Öteki Yüzü (The Other Side of the Night), where he met his eventual first wife Zuhal Olcay, famous Turkish actress and singer. After dividing his time in London and Istanbul for six years, he left the show to stay in Turkey permanently and married Olcay in 1992. He guest starred in an episode of Young Indiana Jones as İsmet İnönü, and went on to star in the Yavuz Özkan film "İki Kadın" (Two Women). He then starred in various movies including the controversial Istanbul Kanatlarımın Altında (Istanbul Under My Wings) and the famous Usta Beni Öldürsene (Master, Kill Me). After critical acclaim for these roles, he earned his first award as a supporting actor in Masumiyet (Innocence).

After deciding he wants to pursue career on stage, he founded "Tiyatro Stüdyosu" (Theatre Studio) with his wife Zuhal Olcay and Ahmet Levendoğlu in 1990. After starring in various plays for six years, he had to return to screen in 1996 because of a fire that has destroyed the theater. He and his wife starred in television and movies to raise money to found another theater. During this era, he starred in Eyvah Kızım Büyüdü (Oh My, My Daughter Has Grown), starting his second era in television. After years of work, he and his wife managed to start a second theater, called "Oyun Atölyesi" (Play Workshop).

His most famous role however came after he started his second theater. He landed a role in Tatlı Hayat, a remake of The Jeffersons. He played the role of İhsan Yıldırım, an angry, racist and foul-mouthed, yet lovable dry cleaner. He was accompanied by legendary actress Türkan Şoray, who played his wife, Asuman Dabak playing the witty cleaner, Neco playing the Greek neighbor (The enmity between Greeks and Turks were put instead of the Black-White one in the original) and Çolpan İlhan playing Neco's wife. He and the show's breakthrough character İrfan (played by Celal Kadri Kınoğlu) are regarded as the best characters in Turkish TV history. He divorced Zuhal Olcay in 2004 and began a relationship with Aşkın Nur Yengi, a famous Turkish singer. They married in 2006 and had a girl.

After Tatlı Hayat, he starred in Neredesin Firuze (Where Are You Firuze?), Hırsız Var (Thief!) and Hacivat Karagöz Neden Öldürüldü? (Why Were Hacivat&Karagöz Murdered?). His most recent role in Polis (Police) however, is his most critically acclaimed role after Tatlı Hayat. His portrayal of the troubled police legend Musa Rami has gained critical acclaim from both critics and viewers, who thought the movie was too experimental. Bilginer, however, has said that he will work in all of Onur Ünlü's (screenwriter and director of Polis) movies, even as an extra if required.

Bilginer played the role of Mustafa Kemal Atatürk in an İş Bank commercial, which first aired on 10 November 2007 during the 69th commemorations of Atatürk's death.

Bilginer co-starred in the 2009 American thriller The International as Ahmet Sunay, a Turkish high-tech missile guidance system dealer. He was accompanied by Clive Owen and Naomi Watts in this movie.

Bilginer plays Aydin, an imposing grey-haired former actor, in Winter Sleep, which won the Palme d'Or at the Cannes Film Festival in 2014.

In 2018, Bilginer played Dr. Ranbir Sartain, the new psychiatrist of Michael Myers, in the slasher sequel Halloween, and starred in the TV series Şahsiyet, playing a retired court clerk who is diagnosed with Alzheimer's Disease. The latter role won him an International Emmy Award for Best Actor. In 2020, he played the lead villain Dr Greif in the first season of the hit Prime Video series Alex Rider, based on the bestselling novels by Anthony Horowitz.

In 2022, it was announced that Bilginer would star as Barbara Nadel's fictional Istanbul detective Çetin İkmen, in the Paramount+ series The Turkish Detective.

Personal life 
In 1987, Bilginer traveled to İstanbul to film the TV series Gecenin Öteki Yüzü (The Other Side of the Night), where he met actress/singer Zuhal Olcay; they married in 1992 and divorced in 2004. He married Aşkın Nur Yengi in 2006 and has a daughter from this marriage; they divorced in 2012.

Filmography

Films

TV series

Awards
47th International Emmy Awards, 2019

References

External links 
 Biography of Haluk Bilginer - Biyografi.info
 Filmography of Haluk Bilginer - Sinematurk.com
 

1954 births
Best Actor Golden Boll Award winners
Best Supporting Actor Golden Orange Award winners
Golden Butterfly Award winners
Living people
Actors from İzmir
Turkish male stage actors
Turkish male film actors
Turkish male television actors
Turkish game show hosts
Alumni of the London Academy of Music and Dramatic Art
Turkish male soap opera actors
International Emmy Award for Best Actor winners